Spasoje Hadži Popović (18 August 1882 – 3 July 1926) was a Serbian teacher in Bitola and editor of the newspaper Južne Zvezde (Southern Stars). He was born in Akritas, in Florina (now Greece). Growing up, he was a witness to the conflict between the Ecumenical Patriarchate of Constantinople and Bulgarian Exarchate, which divided the Slavic Christian people in Ottoman Macedonia. He enrolled in the Serbian Gymnasium in Bitola in 1899 and subsequently in the teacher school in Aleksinac, which had been moved there from Belgrade, together with many pupils from Ottoman territory. He was a member of the Saint Sava Society. Popović was murdered by VMRO agents, who conducted a range of assassinations and terrorist acts against Serbs at that time.

References

Sources

External links
 

Serbian educators
20th-century Serbian people
Serbs from the Ottoman Empire
Serbian murder victims
Serbian newspaper people
1882 births
1926 deaths
People from Florina (regional unit)